is a district located in the eastern portion of Meguro, Tokyo, Japan. It consists of 1- to 6-chōme. 

 is a historic hotel and restaurant building located on the eastern edge of Shimomeguro.

Education
Meguro City Board of Education operates public elementary and junior high schools.

Shimomeguro 1-3 chōme are zoned to Shimomeguro Elementary School (下目黒小学校), while 4-6-chōme are zoned to Fudo Elementary School (不動小学校). All of Shimomeguro (1-6 chōme) is zoned to Otori Junior High School (大鳥中学校).

References

Districts of Meguro